Powdery mildew of lilac, or Erysiphe syringae (formerly Microsphaera syringae) is a fungal pathogen of lilacs.

Importance 
The host of the fungal pathogen, Syringa vulgaris or the common lilac, is an ancient plant with significance in horticultural activities and wild roots in eastern Europe. Its Latin epithet, vulgaris, translates into ‘common’ in English, and was popularized by the pioneer taxonomist Carl von Linné.

One of the first dutiful observations of the pathogen, E. syringae, was made in a journal of the German Botanical Society, Berichte der Deutschen Botanische Gesellschaft, where it was observed as a powdery mildew pathogen unique to lilacs referencing the physical characteristics of its ascocarp appendages.

The pathogen contributes to a deathly and diseased look. Common lilac is known for its spring flowers, which can be altered due to decay of flowering stems after intense infection.

Symptoms 
Powdery mildew of lilac leaves an opaque-white discoloration on the leaves of S. vulgaris. This process is predominant at the end of the season but can begin to take place during new growth.  Eventually the fungal pathogen contributes to the damaging and early senescing of the infected leaves. The opaque-white discoloration is mycelial growth along the surface of the leaf. When the pathogen is sufficiently advanced, the presence of small dark dots indicates the production of cleistothecium (chasmothecium), an important structure in the protection of potential inoculum.

Treatment 
There are methods to treat powdery mildew using home-made preparations including fresh milk, which contains the active anti-pathogenic compound lecithin. Lecithin is recognized by the European Union as a treatment for powdery mildews diseases and is commonly available in the soy-derived formulation ‘soy lecithin’. Other experimental treatments include using baking soda (disrupts pH), neem oil (fungicidal properties), or sulfur containing solutions. Historically, flowers of sulfur has been prepared into a dust and applied to the leaves.

Synthetic compounds such as thiophanate-methyl, propiconazole, and chlorothalonil are used to treat variety of powdery mildew diseases, as well as other fungal pathogens.

Many chemical treatments are known to contribute to disease resistance, and can be harmful if not used with appropriate caution. Compounds with high risk such as thiophanate-methyl can be referred to in the FRAC (Fungicide Resistance Action Committee) Code List document. To avoid health risks refer to the product's label and the appropriate Material Safety Data Sheet.

Cultural controls such as selective pruning can prevent suitable environmental conditions of the pathogen by increasing air circulation. Collection and destruction of plant debris can disrupt the pathogen’s life cycle.

References 

syringae
Fungal plant pathogens and diseases